Diesel bug is contamination of diesel fuel by microbes such as bacteria and fungi.

Water can get into diesel fuel as a result of condensation, rainwater penetration or adsorption from the air — modern biodiesel is especially hygroscopic.  The presence of water then encourages microbial growth which either occurs at the interface between the oil and water or on the tank walls, depending on whether the microbes need oxygen.  Species which may grow in this way include:

 bacteria — Clostridium; Desulfotomaculum; Desulfovibrio; Flavobacterium; Hydrogenomonas; Pseudomonas; Sarcina
 fungi — Aspergillus; Candida keroseneae; Fusarium; Hormoconis resinae

Fuel companies agree that if left untreated fuel will remain reliable for just 6–12 months, after which fuel contamination (such as the diesel bug) begins to appear. Most industrial engine manufacturers now recommend a fuel conditioning programme to ensure the reliability of fuel.

References

External links
 Stored Fuel for Back Up Generators - including "How to minimize the risk of fuel contamination occurring"

Diesel fuel